Salomon Adler (before 3 March 1630 – 1709 in Milan) was a German painter of the Baroque period, active in Milan and Bergamo as a portrait painter. He was the mentor of Fra' Galgario. Born in Danzig (Gdańsk), died in Milan.

Biography 

Adler came from a family of cloth makers in Gdansk. He was of Lutheran faith. His manner of painting (reminiscent of Rembrandt and his predilection for oriental clothing in his portraits) suggests an early education in Gdansk. Perhaps he was again the same age Andreas Ruthardt the painter Daniel Schultz in Gdansk in the doctrine and probably went with him before 1653 to Italy (1653 is his baptismal record in Gdansk in Italy handed down). His artworks show the influence of portrait painters from Venice (Nicolò Renieri and Tiberio Tinelli). In the years from 1679 to 1691 he was demonstrably in Milan. He was much appreciated as a portrait painter.

He was the teacher of Fra' Galgario (Vittore Ghislandi), who went to Milan to study his works being portrayed several times.

Rembrandt may also have influenced him through his pupil Wilhelm Drost, who was temporarily in Venice. In addition, the school of tenebrosi with its light-dark contrasts on him.

Self-portraits of Adler can be found in Bergamo, Milan (Brera gallery and collection Franco Marinotti), Budapest (possibly replica of the Self-portrait in the Uffizi), and in the Uffizi and the Museo Bardini in Florence. In addition to Rembrandt, the French court painter Hyacinthe Rigaud is also mentioned as an influence. The only work signed by Adler is the portrait of a young man in the Germanisches Nationalmuseum Nuremberg, which was acquired in 1963 from the Italian art trade. Known are over a dozen paintings, almost all portrait (except a Judith and an allegory).

In 1955 there was an exhibition to him in the Palazzo della Ragione (Bergamo). A self-portrait was found in the Brera in Milan.

See also
 List of German painters

References 

 Nancy, Musée des beaux-arts: peintures italiennes et espagnoles, XIVe–XIXe siècle, Clara Gelly; Published 2006; IAC Éditions; . Entry 215.

17th-century Italian painters
Italian male painters
18th-century Italian painters
German Baroque painters
17th-century German people
17th-century births
1709 deaths
18th-century Italian male artists